Knockin' on Heaven's Door is a 1997 German crime tragicomedy film by Thomas Jahn, starring Til Schweiger, Moritz Bleibtreu, Jan Josef Liefers and Rutger Hauer. Its name derives from the Bob Dylan song which is also on the film's soundtrack. It was entered into the 20th Moscow International Film Festival where Til Schweiger won the Silver St. George for Best Actor.

The film has received widespread popularity in Russia and other post-Soviet states and has attained a cult status there.

Plot 
Two patients (Martin Brest and Rudi Wurlitzer) meet in a hospital, just after learning that both have untreatable diseases with short life expectancies. They start talking about their death that is to come very soon. When they find a bottle of tequila, Martin finds out that Rudi has never seen the sea. Martin tells Rudi that all they talk about in Heaven is how beautiful the sea is.

Drunk and still in their pajamas, they steal a baby blue Mercedes-Benz W113 classic roadster and go for their last mission - to see the sea. The car belongs to a crime boss. They rob several small shops, only to find that there is a million deutsche marks in cash in the trunk of their car.

As they progress closer to their goal, police along with gangsters start the hot pursuit. Eventually, the two friends find themselves trapped in the middle of a countryside road by police units on one side and gangsters on the other, pointing their guns at each other. The stand-off finally erupts into a big shoot-out while the two make a desperate escape through the corn field. After that, Martin buys a pink Cadillac of the same model as the one which Elvis Presley presented to his mother. His wish is to give the same present to his own mother. As he fulfills the wish, they get ambushed by police near Martin's mother's house. Martin pretends to have a seizure and falls on the ground. He is taken to the hospital in an ambulance with Rudi sitting by his side. En route, Martin and Rudi hijack the vehicle to continue their quest. On the way to the ocean they stop by a brothel, where Rudi wants to fulfil his wish to have sex with two women at the same time. By coincidence, the brothel is owned by the boss whose money they had found in the car they have stolen at the beginning of the journey. They are seen by the two gangsters who were after them throughout their journey. The gangsters take Rudi and Martin to their boss who asks them for money they should return.  Martin says that the money was spent and sent to various people which drives the criminal boss insane. Enraged, the boss points a gun at them ready to shoot, but Curtiz, the most influential criminal to whom the money was meant to be delivered, comes in. After a short talk he says “Then you better run, before you run out of time”. The capo goes on talking about that in heaven everybody would be talking about the ocean. Curtiz spares their lives and lets them go.

The film ends as Martin and Rudi arrive at the ocean's shore. They walk to the sandy beach and Martin falls dead on the ground. Rudi imperturbably sits down beside his friend, facing the ocean and watching the surf.

Cast 
 Til Schweiger as Martin Brest
 Jan Josef Liefers as Rudi Wurlitzer
 Thierry Van Werveke as Henk, The Belgian
 Moritz Bleibtreu as Abdul, The Turk
 Huub Stapel as Frankie "Boy" Beluga
 Leonard Lansink as Kommissar Schneider
 Ralph Herforth as Assistant Keller
 Cornelia Froboess as Frau Brest, Martin's Mother
 Rutger Hauer as Curtiz
 Christiane Paul as Shop Assistant In A Boutique
 Xenia Seeberg as Policewoman

Reception 
The film opened on 522 screens in Germany and opened at number one at the box office with a gross of $3,035,034 for the four-day weekend. It was the fifth highest-grossing film of the year in Germany (and the highest-grossing German film) with a gross of $21,288,865. Worldwide, it grossed $23.8 million.

Remake 
A Japanese remake was announced to be released in February 2009 under the title Heaven's Door (directed by Michael Arias and with music by Plaid). In contrast to the original, protagonists in the remake are 28-year-old young man and a 14-year-old girl.

See also 
 Hawks, a 1988 film with a similar plot
 The Bucket List, a 2007 film with a similar plot

References

External links 
 

1997 films
1990s crime comedy films
1990s buddy films
1990s chase films
1990s comedy thriller films
German crime comedy films
German action films
1990s German-language films
Films directed by Thomas Jahn
Films about cancer
Films shot in Cologne
Films set in Germany
Films distributed by Disney
Touchstone Pictures films
1997 action comedy films
1990s German films